Tianshui railway station is a station on Longhai railway in Tianshui, Gansu.

The station is served by the Tianshui Tram, which opened in 2020. Since 2017, Tianshui has also been served by Tianshui South railway station on the Xi'an–Baoji High-Speed Railway.

History
The station was established in 1948, and was the westernmost and last station built by the government of ROC in mainland China.

The current station building was completed in 1989 and renovated in 2017. The renovation project was finished on 31 January 2018.

Station layout

The station has two parts: the passenger station in the south and the classification yard in the north. The passenger station has 1 side platform and 2 island platforms (5 platform sides).

References

Railway stations in Gansu
Stations on the Longhai Railway
Railway stations in China opened in 1948